Samuel Bowtell (7 December 1806 – May 1881) was an English cricketer who was associated with Cambridge Town Club (CTC) and made his first-class debut in 1830.

References

1806 births
1881 deaths
English cricketers
English cricketers of 1826 to 1863
Cambridge Town Club cricketers